Vladimir Yevgenyevich Churov (born March 27, 1953, in Leningrad, Soviet Union) is a Russian official and politician. From March 2007 to March 2016, he served a member (delegated by the State Duma) and the Chairman of the Central Election Commission of Russia. Since June 2016 he has been working as an Ambassador for Special Tasks at the Russian Ministry of Foreign Affairs.

In 1977 he graduated from the Department of Physics at Leningrad State University.

In 1992–2003 he worked on the Committee for External Relations of the Saint Petersburg Mayor's Office, in 1992–1996 under Vladimir Putin, in 1995–2003 as a deputy head of the Committee.  According to Marina Salye, Churov worked for KGB.

In December 2003 – March 2007 he was a deputy in the State Duma (of LDPR faction).

On January 30, 2007, amendments to the Russian election legislation, which would allow people without a law degree to become members of the Central Election Commission, were passed by the President of Russia. This enabled Churov to be elected to the Commission. 

From the beginning, Churov created an image of a person who would remain loyal to president Putin under any circumstances. During his tenure, he made a number of controversial statements, which were interpreted as his willingness to rubber-stamp election results favorable to Putin even if there were reports of widespread violations. Participation of independent observers was made considerably more complicated. In the 2011 Russian legislative election, Churov maintained that the elections were free of falsifications, although the media reported a number of instances when the data of Central Election Commission of Russia differed with the protocols of election districts. One of the demands during the 2011–13 Russian protests was the resignation of Churov. On the other hand, the Central Electoral Committee did not falsify the results itself, and Churov was even instrumental in creating the efficient appeal system, which helped to strike down some decisions of lower level electoral committees.

On 27 March 2016, the executive term of Churov expired, and he was not reappointed by Putin. The new Chairperson of the Central Election Commission of Russia became Ella Pamfilova.

In June 2016 Churov was appointed an Ambassador for Special Tasks at Russian Ministry for Foreign Affairs.

References

External links 
 Biography, Lenta.ru (in Russian)
 Interview with Vladimir Churov, Kommersant, April 9, 2007. (in Russian)
 Vladimir Churov at Armen Oganesyan's talkshow "Vis-a-Vis with the World" (in English)
 Vladimir Churov at Armen Oganesyan's talkshow "Vis-a-Vis with the World" (in Russian)

1953 births
Living people
Fourth convocation members of the State Duma (Russian Federation)
Members of election commissions
Ambassador Extraordinary and Plenipotentiary (Russian Federation)